Jennie Harbour (1893–1959) was an English Art Deco artist and illustrator.

Life
Jennie Harbour is believed to have been born in London about 1893.

Harbour worked for The Raphael Tuck Publishing Company by 1919. It published illustrated postcards, calendars, and books. At first, she created illustrations like 18th-century paintings of gardens and flowers for calendars. International orders came into the company for her "delightfully distinctive, bright and pleasant" cards in 1919. Her prints were very successful and Raphael Tuck made an arrangement with Reinthal & Newman of New York to hand-print the works for the United States market.

In 1921, she illustrated My Favourite Book of Fairy Tales which had a combination of black and white and 12 color illustrations for Raphael Tuck. She also illustrated My Book of Mother Goose Nursery Rhymes and Hans Christian Andersen's stories. She created the illustrations Call of Spring and When Autumn Winds Do Blow for Raphael Tuck in 1921.

In 1927, she illustrated The Yellow Fairy Book of the Newbery classics series, which was edited by Andrew Lang and published by David McKay Company. The book that was reissued in 1934 included 48 stories, including tales by Hans Christian Andersen and Native Americans and folklore from France, Germany, Poland and other countries. The Green Fairy Book, published in 1934, also included stories from a number of countries. The Story of the Three Bears, Thee Fisherman and his Wife, and The Snuff-Box were a few of the stories. Its authors included Anne Claude de Caylus and Madame d'Aulnoy.

She died in the 1950s.

References

External links
 
 Mary Had a Little Lamb, by Harbour

1890s births
1959 deaths
English women artists
English illustrators